The Farrell Brothers are a rockabilly group from Selkirk, Manitoba, Canada.  Their stage show was noted for being professional and high energy.

History

The Farrell Brothers have released six CDs, beginning with 1999's The Ballad of Jackpine Slash. Two of the band's independent albums were re-released in England by Raucous Records, and in 2006 The Farrell Bros. completed a 30-stop tour in Europe in support of them.  They then set out on a tour in Canada to support their contribution to the Zombie Night in Canada compilation album.

The band's 2003 album, Rumble @ The Opry!, released on the Teenage Rampage label, received positive reviews for its songwriting.  It was reissued in 2011 by the Transistor 66 label, and appeared on campus radio charts.

In 2002 the Farrell Bros. performed at the Dawson City Music Festival. They have performed in clubs, bars and small concert venues in various Canadian cities, including Vancouver Toronto and Winnipeg. 

The sound on band's 2005 album, This is a Riot, was compared to that of The Clash, and The Farrell Bros. contributed a track to the 2002 Clash tribute album "This is Rockabilly Clash". A later release was Dead End Boys in 2007.

Although no albums have been released since 2007, in September 2021, the band reported on its Facebook page that it is still together.

Current members
 Gordie Farrell - upright bass, vocals, guitar
 Shawn Farrell - guitar, vocals
 Nuke Norval - drums

Discography

Main albums
1999: Ballad of Jackpine Slash, Independent
2000: Go to Hell, Independent
2003: Rumble @ The Opry!, Teen Rampage Records
2004: Curbstomp Boogie, Raucous Records
2005: This is a Riot, Stumble Records
2007: Dead End Boys, Raucous Records

Compilations
2005: Zombie Night in Canada Vol. 2, Stumble Records

See also
List of bands from Canada
List of psychobilly bands

References

External links
Official website
Myspace profile

Canadian rock music groups
Psychobilly groups
Musical groups from Manitoba
Selkirk, Manitoba
Musical groups established in 1999
1999 establishments in Manitoba